The Jardin botanique de Talence (2.5 hectares) is a small botanical garden within the Parc du Château Peixotto at 3 avenue Espeleta, Talence, Gironde, Aquitaine, France. The park is open daily without charge, but the botanical garden itself is open only to students and professionals.

Today's garden belongs to the Université de Bordeaux. It contains about 2000 species of pharmaceutical and medical interest, including numerous taxa Cucurbitaceae, Cyperaceae, Malvaceae, as well as two greenhouses, an orangerie, and a classroom building.

See also 
 List of botanical gardens in France

References 
 Mairie Talence – Histoire
 Mairie Talence – photographs
 Jardin botanique de Talence
 (French)
 Gralon.net entry (French)
 (French)
 Notre Famille – postcard of the botanical garden
 Culture.gouv.fr database, with photographs

Gardens in Gironde
Botanical gardens in France